Manoah's wife (also referred to as Samson's mother) is an unnamed figure in the Book of Judges, the wife of Manoah. She is introduced in Judges 13:2 as a barren woman. The angel of the Lord appears to her and tells her she will have a son. She later gives birth to Samson.

J. Cheryl Exum argues that Manoah's wife is more perceptive than her husband, in that she "senses at once something otherworldly" about the man of God who visits her, and "recognizes a divine purpose behind the revelation." Bruce Waltke regards her as cynical, noting that, unlike Hannah, she neither prays for a child nor praises God afterwards.

Ancient Rabbinic tradition identifies this woman as the Hazzelelponi mentioned in 1 Chronicles 4:3, and the Talmud gives her a variant of this name, Zelelponith.

See also
 List of names for the biblical nameless

References

Book of Judges people
Samson
Angelic visionaries
Unnamed people of the Bible
Women in the Hebrew Bible